Neilor Elias Cassimiro or simply Neilor (born January 31, 1986 in Lambari), is a Brazilian defensive midfielder. He currently plays for Caxias on loan from Cruzeiro.

Contract
Caxias (Loan) 1 January 2008 to 30 April 2008
Cruzeiro 8 May 2007 to 30 April 2008

External links
 CBF
 Tupi-MG contrata mais dois jogadores

1986 births
Living people
Brazilian footballers
Cruzeiro Esporte Clube players
Tupi Football Club players
Sociedade Esportiva e Recreativa Caxias do Sul players
Association football midfielders